Juan Gabriel Maldonado Ovelar (born 18 May 1990) is a Paraguayan football forward. He currently plays for Cerro Porteño.

Maldonado has played reserve division where he has scored goals, but is not a regular player on the first team squad. In the Clausura 2010 he entered for Pablo Zeballos in his third game for Cerro Porteño and scored his first goal.

External links
 BDFA profile

1990 births
Living people
Paraguayan footballers
Association football forwards
Cerro Porteño players